Dale M. Cochran (November 20, 1928 – August 27, 2018) was an American politician from the state of Iowa.

Career
Cochran was born in Fort Dodge, Iowa in 1928. He attended Iowa State University, where he earned a Bachelor of Science degree, and is a former farmer. In 1952, he married Jeannene Hirsch, and has three children. Cochran served as a Democrat in the Iowa House of Representatives from 1965 to 1987. He served district 62 from 1965 to 1973, district 45 from 1973 to 1983, and district 14 from 1983 to 1987. He was Minority Floor Leader from 1971 to 1974, Assistant Minority Leader from 1981 to 1982, Chairman of the House Agriculture Committee from 1983 to 1984, and Speaker of the House from 1975 to 1978. From 1987 to 1998, he served as the Iowa Secretary of Agriculture. He died in 2018 at the age of 89.

References

1928 births
2018 deaths
Secretaries of Agriculture of Iowa
Democratic Party members of the Iowa House of Representatives
Farmers from Iowa
Politicians from Fort Dodge, Iowa
Iowa State University alumni